Danielle Hartsell (born November 21, 1980 in Ann Arbor, Michigan) is an American former competitive pair skater. With brother Steve Hartsell, she is the 1999  U.S. National Champion and 1997 World Junior Champion.  She married Chris Minnis on September 20, 2003

Programs

Results
Ladies' Singles

(with Steve Hartsell)

Professional career

References

External links
 
 Pairs on Ice Profile

Navigation

1980 births
Living people
American female pair skaters
Sportspeople from Ann Arbor, Michigan
Four Continents Figure Skating Championships medalists
World Junior Figure Skating Championships medalists
21st-century American women
20th-century American women